WSFL-TV (channel 39) is a television station in Miami, Florida, United States, affiliated with The CW. It is owned by the E. W. Scripps Company alongside Ion Television owned-and-operated station WPXM-TV (channel 35), also licensed to Miami. WSFL-TV's studios are located on Southwest 78th Avenue in Plantation, Florida; its transmitter is located in Andover, Florida.

History

As an independent station
The station first signed on the air on October 16, 1982 as WDZL. It was originally owned by Channel 39 Broadcasting Ltd. Operating as an independent station, the station maintained a general entertainment format consisting of cartoons, off-network dramas, classic movies, a few older off-network sitcoms, and religious programs. Odyssey Partners, which would later evolve into Renaissance Broadcasting (and which had owned WTXX, now WCCT-TV, in Waterbury, Connecticut), owned an interest in WDZL.

In December 1984, Grant Broadcasting System signed on competing independent WBFS-TV (channel 33) with a stronger general entertainment lineup, and surpassed WDZL in the ratings immediately. Still, WDZL was profitable, especially with the large amount of barter cartoons that was available to the station. It was still running programs that other area stations passed on until the wave of affiliation switches in January 1989. When WCIX (channel 6, now WFOR-TV on channel 4) was sold to CBS and dropped most of its syndicated programs, Fox programming moved to WSVN (channel 7), which lost its NBC affiliation to WTVJ (channel 4, now on channel 6), which became an NBC-owned station at that time. Most of the syndicated programs dropped by WCIX, primarily cartoons and sitcoms, were acquired by WDZL, helping it to become a far stronger independent station by the early 1990s (WSVN acquired some of WCIX's cartoons to air on weekend mornings, along most of WCIX's movie packages, while WCIX retained some of its syndicated programs). In 1991, WDZL began branding its children's programming as the Fun Zone; the programming block was hosted by Lauren D. The station acquired the rights to Fox Kids after WSVN dropped the programming block in 1993.

In mid-January 1994, the station began airing the Action Pack programming block with a TekWar TV movie. The rating for the movie were 9.1/13, which was 225% more than November and more than any 2 hour movie from last year.

As a WB affiliate
WDZL became a charter WB affiliate when the network debuted on January 11, 1995. In 1997, the Tribune Company acquired Renaissance Communications' six television stations. As Kids' WB programming expanded to three hours on weekdays, the station dropped Fox Kids (which moved to Home Shopping Network station WYHS (channel 69, now WAMI-TV). Channel 39 altered its call letters to WBZL (simply replacing the "D" with a "B") in 1998 to emphasize its affiliation with The WB. Throughout its affiliation with the network, the station was branded on-air as "WB 39". By that point, WBZL began airing more first-run talk and reality shows during the daytime hours, along with children's programming, and off-network sitcoms in the evenings. By 2005, it was the only remaining station in South Florida that still ran children's programs on weekday afternoons due to the presence of Kids' WB (which would discontinue its weekday afternoon block nationwide on December 30, 2005, leaving only a five-hour lineup on Saturday mornings).

As a CW affiliate
On January 24, 2006, the Warner Bros. unit of Time Warner and CBS Corporation announced that the two companies would shut down The WB and UPN and combine the networks' respective programming to create a new "fifth" network called The CW. On the day of the announcement, Tribune Broadcasting signed a ten-year agreement to affiliate 16 of its WB affiliates, including WBZL, with The CW. However, it would not have been an upset had WBFS (which is owned by CBS News and Stations) been chosen as Miami's CW station. Representatives for the network were on record as preferring the "strongest" WB and UPN stations to become The CW's charter affiliates, and Miami–Fort Lauderdale was one of the few markets where the WB and UPN stations both had relatively strong viewership. Throughout the summer, WBZL started using the CW logo in station promotions and also began referring to itself as "CW South Florida". On September 17, the station changed its call letters to WSFL-TV, to reference to its geographic location. WSFL became a charter CW affiliate when the network debuted the next day on September 18.

On September 1, 2008, in a corporate move by Tribune to de-emphasize references to The CW in the branding of its CW-affiliated stations, channel 39 was rebranded as "SFL" and it debuted a logo featuring the stylistic capital "S" in the Sun-Sentinel nameplate logo. Around the same time, WSFL moved its operations into the Fort Lauderdale offices of the Sun-Sentinel newspaper. By February 2012, the station rebranded as "SFL-TV" to de-emphasize its connection to the Sun-Sentinel, as WSFL no longer offers full-scale local newscasts.

On July 10, 2013, Tribune announced plans to spin off its publishing division into a separate company. The split was finalized in 2014, and WSFL-TV remain with the Tribune Company (which retain all non-publishing assets, including the broadcasting, digital media and Media Services units), while its newspapers (including the Sun-Sentinel) became part of the similarly named Tribune Publishing Company. On February 1, 2017, the station reverted to the "CW South Florida" branding.

Sale attempts and sales since 2017

Sinclair Broadcast Group entered into an agreement to acquire Tribune Media on May 8, 2017 for $3.9 billion, plus assumption of $2.7 billion in Tribune debt. In order to meet regulatory approval, Sinclair agreed to divest WSFL to Fox Television Stations in what was part of a $910 million deal; Fox executives declined to make any public statement regarding the status of current affiliate WSVN which had a contract with the network through June 30, 2019. Both transactions were nullified when Tribune Media terminated the merger and filed a breach of contract lawsuit against Sinclair; this followed FCC chairman Ajit Pai rejecting the deal and the commission voting to put it through a hearing.

Nexstar Media Group subsequently announced their acquisition of Tribune Media on December 3, 2018 for $6.4 billion in cash and debt. As part of the deal, WSFL was divested to the E. W. Scripps Company in a series of transactions with multiple companies that totaled $1.32 billion. The sale was completed on September 19, 2019.

Newscasts

Tribune era

In 1997, NBC owned-and-operated station WTVJ and the Sun-Sentinel entered into a partnership to co-produce a nightly 10:00 p.m. newscast on WDZL, titled WB 39 News at 10. When the station became a CW affiliate, the newscast's title was changed accordingly to CW News at 10. On March 5, 2008, WTVJ began broadcasting its local newscasts in high definition; the 10:00 p.m. broadcast on WSFL was included in the upgrade. For the duration of the 2008 Summer Olympics, WSFL's newscast utilized a two-anchor format and closely mirrored the format of the newscasts airing on WTVJ. The 10:00 p.m. newscast during this time was broadcast from WTVJ's primary news set at Peacock Plaza in Miramar, with the only alterations being differences in the set's duratrans for the WSFL newscast. The WTVJ-produced newscast on WSFL was one of a handful of newscasts that were produced through news share agreements with Tribune-owned stations, including newscasts airing sister stations WPHL-TV in Philadelphia (whose 10:00 p.m. newscast was originally produced by NBC-owned WCAU, and has since transferred production to ABC-owned WPVI-TV) and KRCW-TV in Portland, Oregon (whose prime time newscast was originally produced by NBC affiliate KGW, and has since transferred production to Nexstar-owned CBS affiliate KOIN).

On August 26, 2008, WTVJ and WSFL agreed to terminate their news share agreement, most likely due to WTVJ's planned acquisition by Post-Newsweek Stations (then-owner of ABC affiliate WPLG, channel 10), which was later aborted due to financial issues and lack of FCC approval; the final broadcast of the 10:00 p.m. newscast aired on August 31. WSFL later began to produce a weekday morning news program, which aired for four hours from 5:00 to 9:00 a.m., on April 13, 2009; the program was broadcast out of the Sun-Sentinels former auditorium on the first floor of the Sun-Sentinel Building on Las Olas in Fort Lauderdale. The Morning Show was canceled on August 4, 2010 due to low ratings. The station continues to produce the public affairs program South Florida Voices, on Sunday mornings at 6 a.m., which is hosted by Deborah Ally; this program was relaunched with a new host and under a new title in September 2010. WSFL also began producing nightly news updates in mid-August 2010, which air five times a day. WSFL also produces local news inserts that appear during its broadcast of EyeOpener (which is produced by Dallas sister station KDAF) on weekday mornings.

On September 28, 2015, WSFL-TV became the third station to launch the Tribune-developed news format, NewsFix, launching a half-hour prime time newscast, NewsFix SFL at 10:00. The format de-emphasizes the traditional use of anchors and reporters, in favor of using footage featuring those involved and continuity provided by a narrator to help illustrate the story. , NewsFix SFL no longer airs on the station.

Scripps era

On November 14, 2019, Scripps announced that they would bring local news back to WSFL, originally starting in spring 2020. However, due in part to the COVID-19 pandemic, the newscast debut did not occur. On March 10, 2021, it was announced that WPLG (now owned by BH Media) would produce 7–9 a.m. and 10 p.m. newscasts for WSFL, which began on June 1.

Technical information

Subchannels
The station's digital signal is multiplexed:

Analog-to-digital conversion
WSFL-TV ended programming on its analog signal, on UHF channel 39, on June 12, 2009, the official date in which full-power television stations in the United States transitioned from analog to digital broadcasts under federal mandate. The station's digital signal continued to broadcast on its pre-transition UHF channel 19. Through the use of PSIP, digital television receivers display station's virtual channel as its former UHF analog channel 39.

References

External links

SFL-TV
The CW affiliates
TrueReal affiliates
Antenna TV affiliates
Court TV affiliates
E. W. Scripps Company television stations
Television channels and stations established in 1982
1982 establishments in Florida